Fabio Jakobsen (born 31 August 1996) is a Dutch cyclist, who currently rides for UCI WorldTeam .

Career

During the 2019 Vuelta a España Jakobsen won two stages, including the final stage of the race on stage 21 in Madrid.

A few metres before the finish of the 1st stage in the 2020 Tour de Pologne he heavily crashed after Dylan Groenewegen deviated from his line, forcing Jakobsen into the barriers. The race doctor initially reported that Jakobsen had suffered several major injuries, including serious brain trauma and damage to the upper respiratory tract, a broken palate, and heavy blood loss, and was in life-threatening condition. On 7 August 2020, the race organisers announced that Jakobsen was out of the induced coma and in "good condition". On 18 August 2020, Jakobsen said that he was "glad to be alive" following the crash. Jakobsen returned to professional racing at the Presidential Tour of Turkey on 11 April 2021.

Jakobsen raced the 2021 Vuelta a España, where he improved on his 2019 result by winning three stages on this occasion: stages four, eight and sixteen. The early part of the race saw him battle with Jasper Philipsen for the green Points Classification jersey. Philipsen abandoned the race after stage 10 due to illness, which left Magnus Cort and overall GC contender Primož Roglič as Jakobsen's closest points rivals. However, stage 16 proved to be decisive, when Jakobsen won the sprint finish on his 25th birthday. Although he was unable to increase his points total following this stage victory, he remained the overall leader in the points competition until the completion of the race, earning him his first Grand Tour jersey.

At the end of the 2021 season, Jakobsen was nominated for Comeback Rider of the Year award on CyclingnewsForum. Jakobsen would win the award in a dominating fashion, gaining the majority of the votes over the other nine riders.

In 2022 he won Kuurne-Brussels-Kuurne, a stage in Paris-Nice and the Tour of Belgium. He also won the points classification as well as multiple stages in Volta ao Algarve, the Tour of Hungary and Volta a la Comunitat Valenciana. In the 2022 Tour de France, which was his first entry in the Tour, he won the sprint finish on stage 2. On stage 17, which was a major mountain stage with a summit finish in Peyragudes, Jakobsen's entire team returned to the finish line to cheer when they realized he was going to make it inside the time cut. He was the final surviving rider to cross the finish line, and then collapsed up against the barriers with the Broom wagon driving across the line fifteen seconds later. He survived the next day in the high mountains and the rest of the race, making his first Tour de France a successful one.

Major results

2016
 1st  Road race, National Under-23 Road Championships
 1st Slag om Norg
 1st Stage 2 ZLM Tour
2017
 1st  Road race, National Under-23 Road Championships
 1st Eschborn-Frankfurt City Loop U23
 1st Ronde van Noord-Holland
 Olympia's Tour
1st Stages 3 & 4
 1st Stage 2 Tour de l'Avenir
 1st Stage 2 Tour de Normandie
 1st Stage 4 Tour Alsace
 2nd Dorpenomloop Rucphen
 4th Arno Wallaard Memorial
 5th Slag om Norg
 6th Road race, UEC European Under-23 Road Championships
 8th Zuid Oost Drenthe Classic
2018
 1st Scheldeprijs
 1st Nokere Koerse
 Tour of Guangxi
1st  Points classification
1st Stages 3 & 6
 1st Stage 1 BinckBank Tour
 1st Stage 1 Tour des Fjords
 1st Stage 4 Okolo Slovenska
 2nd Halle–Ingooigem
 4th Dwars door West–Vlaanderen
 6th Great War Remembrance Race
 10th Bretagne Classic
2019
 1st  Road race, National Road Championships
 1st Scheldeprijs
 Vuelta a España
1st Stages 4 & 21
 1st Stage 1 Volta ao Algarve
 1st Stage 3 Tour of Turkey
 1st Stage 4 Tour of California
 2nd Elfstedenronde
2020
 1st Grote Prijs Jean-Pierre Monseré
 Volta ao Algarve
1st  Points classification
1st Stage 1
 1st Stage 1 Tour de Pologne
 1st Stage 5 Volta a la Comunitat Valenciana
 4th Kuurne–Brussels–Kuurne
2021
 1st Eurométropole Tour
 1st Gooikse Pijl
 Vuelta a España
1st  Points classification
1st Stages 4, 8 & 16
 Tour de Wallonie
1st Stages 2 & 5
2022
 1st  Road race, UEC European Road Championships
 1st  Kampioenschap van Vlaanderen
 1st Kuurne–Brussels–Kuurne
 1st Elfstedenronde
 Volta a la Comunitat Valenciana
1st  Points classification
1st Stages 2 & 5
 Volta ao Algarve
1st  Points classification
1st Stages 1 & 3
 Tour de Hongrie
1st  Points classification
1st Stage 2 & 3
 1st Stage 2 Tour de France
 1st Stage 2 Paris–Nice
 1st Stage 5 Tour of Belgium
 6th Münsterland Giro
2023
 1st Stage 2 Tirreno–Adriatico
 1st Stage 2 Vuelta a San Juan
 9th Kuurne–Brussels–Kuurne

Grand Tour general classification results timeline

References

External links

1996 births
Living people
Dutch male cyclists
Dutch Tour de France stage winners
Dutch Vuelta a España stage winners
People from Lingewaal
Cyclists from Gelderland
21st-century Dutch people